Ray Isaac is a former American football quarterback who played one season with the Cleveland Thunderbolts of the Arena Football League. He played college football at Youngstown State University. He helped the Youngstown State Penguins win the National Championship in 1991.

References

External links
Just Sports Stats

Living people
Year of birth missing (living people)
Players of American football from Youngstown, Ohio
American football quarterbacks
African-American players of American football
Youngstown State Penguins football players
Cleveland Thunderbolts players
21st-century African-American people